Laurie Pohutsky (née Tennant; born April 28, 1988) is an American Microbiologist and a politician from Michigan. Pohutsky is the Democratic member of the Michigan House of Representatives from the 17th district.

Early life and education 
Pohutsky was born Laurie Tennant in Livonia, Michigan. She grew up in Redford, Michigan. Between 2006 and 2010 she attended Michigan State University, graduating with a Bachelor of Science in Microbiology. Pohutsky then worked as a laboratory technician for several companies in fields involving food safety, toxicology and health care.

Political career 
In 2018, Pohutsky successfully ran as a Democrat for the Michigan House of Representatives for District 19, narrowly defeating Republican candidate Brian Meakin. In the 2020 election Pohutsky was reelected, once again by a narrow margin.

During the 2020 Democratic presidential primaries, she endorsed Massachusetts Senator Elizabeth Warren for President of the United States.

During the 2022 Michigan House of Representatives election, Pohutskty ran to represent District 17, defeating opponent Penny Crider in a landslide. She was subsequently appointed speaker pro tempore of the Michigan House.

Personal life 
Pohutsky is openly bisexual.

References

External links 
 Laurie Pohutsky at housedems.com
 Laurie Pohutsky at ballotpedia.org

1988 births
21st-century American politicians
21st-century American women politicians
Bisexual politicians
Bisexual women
Democratic Party members of the Michigan House of Representatives
LGBT state legislators in Michigan
Living people
Michigan State University alumni
Women state legislators in Michigan
People from Redford, Michigan